The D'Iberville Apartments is a complex of historic apartment buildings located in Mobile, Alabama.  They were built in 1943 to the designs of architects Harry Pembleton and Aurelius Augustus Evans. They were constructed in a Minimal Traditionalist style of architecture and are notable for their significance to the community planning and development of Mobile during World War II, a time of tremendous growth in the city.  The apartments were added to the National Register of Historic Places on September 3, 2004.

References

Apartment buildings in Alabama
Residential buildings completed in 1943
National Register of Historic Places in Mobile, Alabama
Residential buildings on the National Register of Historic Places in Alabama